Jujubinus curinii is a species of sea snail, a marine gastropod mollusk in the family Trochidae, the top snails.

Description

Distribution
This species occurs in the Mediterranean Sea off Sicily.

References

 Bogi C. & Campani E., 2006: Jujubinus curinii n. sp.: una nuova specie di Trochidae per le coste della Sicilia.; Bollettino Malacologico 41 (9–12): 99–10

External links

curinii
Gastropods described in 2005